"Stir It Up" is a song by American singer Patti LaBelle. It was written by Dan Sembello and Allee Willis and recorded by LaBelle for the motion picture soundtrack album to the 1984 action comedy film Beverly Hills Cop, while production was helmed by Harold Faltermeyer and Keith Forsey. "Stir It Up" was the second of a couple of songs, also including "New Attitude" (1984), she recorded for MCA Records immediately after signing her new contract with that company. Her first full-length album for MCA, Winner in You, would follow the next year.

Released as the second single from the soundtrack, which was awarded the 1986 Grammy Award for Best Score Soundtrack for Visual Media, it reached number five on the US Hot R&B/Hip-Hop Songs. "Stir It Up" was also used as the theme song to the short-lived sitcom Stir Crazy, based on the 1980 movie.

Music video
The music video features Patti LaBelle singing the track in a recording studio with session musicians. This intercuts with a young woman (Motown recording artist Desiree Coleman) running through the streets of Manhattan. She recruits other passers-by who follow her to the studio where Patti and her band are singing. The city shots were filmed in New York City.

Duet version
LaBelle re-recorded "Stir It Up" alongside Joss Stone for the soundtrack to the 2005 Disney animated feature film Chicken Little. This version was produced by Mark Hammond.

Charts

References

1984 songs
1985 singles
Patti LaBelle songs
Joss Stone songs
Songs written for films
Female vocal duets
Songs written by Allee Willis
Songs written by Danny Sembello
MCA Records singles
Song recordings produced by Harold Faltermeyer
Song recordings produced by Keith Forsey